Newton Stewart Football Club are a football club from the town of Newton Stewart in the Dumfries and Galloway area of Scotland. Formed in 1880,as Newton Stewart Athletic but after a further two name changes they became Newton Stewart Football Club in 1902. They are nicknamed the Creesiders, because the town stands on the banks of the River Cree. 

They compete in the South of Scotland Football League, which they have won on three occasions and finished 2nd in the 2014–15 season. Home matches are played at Blairmount Park, which holds around 1,500 spectators. There was a stand at the ground at one stage, but this was demolished due to being unsafe, leaving Blairmount Park a fairly open and undeveloped football venue which has recently been converted into an all-weather 4G surface.

Newton Stewart won their first trophy for 13 years in 2014-15 after defeating local rivals Wigtown & Bladnoch 2–1 in the J. Haig Gordon Cup Final. They then followed that by beating Mid-Annandale 4–0 in the final of the Potts Cup to claim their second trophy of the season. The club ended the season with a cup double which has been their most successful season for many years. The Club captured the South of Scotland League Cup in 2016-17 after a penalty shoot out win in the Final against Threave Rovers at St Marys Park, Kircudbright.

Newton Stewart's strip (uniform) colours are black and white stripes.

As a full member of the Scottish Football Association, the club can play in the Scottish Cup.

Honours

League

South of Scotland Football League:
Winners (3) :  1950–51, 1955–56, 1987–88

Cup

Southern Counties Challenge Cup: 1948–49, 1950–51, 1955–56, 1958–59, 1962–63, 1983–84
Cree Lodge Cup: 1921–22, 1923–24, 1928–29, 1929–30, 1948–49, 1961–62, 1963–64
J. Haig Gordon Cup: 2014–15
Potts Cup: 1951–52, 1952–53, 1961–62, 1987–88, 2014–15
Tweedie Cup: 1905–06, 1906–07, 1926–27, 1991–92, 2021-22
South of Scotland League Cup: 1950–51, 1958–59, 1985–86, 2000–01 2016-17
Wigtownshire & District Cup: 1905–06, 1919–20, 1924–25, 1925–26, 1929–30, 1961–62
Wigtownshire Cup: 1902–03, 1903–04, 1908–09, 1911–12, 1913–14, 1921–22, 1925–26, 1950–51, 1967–68
Wigtownshire & Kirkcudbrightshire Cup: 1948–49, 1950–51
South Supplementary Cup: 1955–56
South of Scotland Cup: 1923–24, 1924–25
Candida Casa Cup: 1910–11, 1912–13
Dumfries & Galloway Cup: 1906–07

References

External links
 Official website
 https://twitter.com/The_Creesiders

Football clubs in Dumfries and Galloway
Association football clubs established in 1884
1884 establishments in Scotland
South of Scotland Football League teams
Newton Stewart